Frederick John Pym Gore CBE RA (8 November 1913 – 31 August 2009), was an English painter.

Biography
Gore was born into the world of art; his father, Spencer Frederick Gore, was a painter, President of the Camden Town Group until his early death in March 1914, and his mother, Mary Joanna (Molly) Kerr, was a dancer from Edinburgh.

As a young man Gore's ambition was to be a philosopher, but as a student at Trinity College, Oxford (following in the steps of his great uncle Bishop Charles Gore), he soon found that his real passion was for drawing and painting at the Ruskin School of Art which he attended almost daily.

Leaving Oxford, and arriving in London, Gore trained at the Slade under Henry Tonks and at the Westminster School of Art with Mark Gertler and Polunin from whom he learnt the flat-on-the-floor method of painting backdrops for the theatre: most useful later on when as an active member of the Balalaika Dance Group as dancer and organiser of events, he enhanced their productions with his professional expertise. He wrote a very successful folk ballet.

Pre-World War II, his career took off when a Greek patron saw his work and asked him to spend a year travelling and painting in Greece.  Visits and extended sojourns to France followed, and an exhibition at Gallery Borghese in Paris in 1938 when Vauxelles called him the English fauve. Soon after, however, he was forced to leave and return to the UK.

During World War II, Gore was camouflage officer for the south-east and helped prepare the troops for the D-Day invasion.

In 1946, he began teaching at Saint Martin's School of Art, where he was Head of Painting from 1951 until 1979.  In 1961 he was appointed Vice-Principal of Saint Martin's until he retired from the post in 1979. His students and colleagues there included many of the most accomplished artists of the twentieth century who continue to acknowledge the encouragement they received from Gore.

Summer months for many years were spent painting outside: on the Greek islands of Paros (1950s) and later on Aegina. Then during the 1960s, the rich hinterland of Majorca, followed by the brilliantly-lit landscapes of Provence.

He exhibited at the Redfern Gallery until they took to abstract art, the Juster Gallery (NY), Fosse, Lavenham, Richmond Hill Gallery – always keeping his independence to exhibit wherever he so wanted.

Gore was a Trustee of the Imperial War Museum (1967–1984), and was Chairman of its Artistic Records Committee (1972–1986).

In 1972, Gore was elected as a Royal Academician, and from 1976 to 1987 he was Chairman of the Royal Academy of Arts Exhibitions Committee.

In 1980, Gore visited the US for the first time to deliver a dissertation at the Yale Center for British Art, New Haven, Connecticut. Staying en route in New York he was so exhilarated by its exciting light and ambience that since then he visited almost yearly. He made an important contribution as a figurative painter with an enormous experience of paint, composition and colour to show the vitality of the US, when American artists had mostly turned to abstraction and were exploring painterly possibilities in a different direction. Gore was made CBE in 1987.

In 1991 he designed a series of posters for the London Transport Museum.

His last solo exhibition was at the Richmond Hill Gallery, London (January 2009).

His published books include "Abstract Art",  "Painting: Some Basic Principles" and "The Baptism, Piero della Francesca"; he is also the author of an unpublished translation of poems by Baudelaire.

Gore died age 95 on 31 August 2009. He is buried in Brompton Cemetery.

Personal life
Frederick Gore had a son and two daughters - Dr. Charles David Gore, Dr. Georgiana Sarah Gore, and Geraldine Lucy Gore. His wife Constance (Connie) survived him.

Works

References

External links
 The Government Art Collection
 Southampton City Art Gallery
 The Bridgeman Art Library
 Fosse Gallery
 War paint: art, war, state and identity in Britain, 1939–1945, Issue 8846 By Brian Foss (Page 16) on Google Books
  – The Times obituary
 Frederick Gore – Daily Telegraph obituary
  – Guardian obituary

1913 births
2009 deaths
People educated at Lancing College
Alumni of Trinity College, Oxford
20th-century British painters
British male painters
21st-century British painters
Alumni of the Slade School of Fine Art
Royal Academicians
Commanders of the Order of the British Empire
Middlesex Regiment officers
British Army personnel of World War II
Burials at Brompton Cemetery
Camoufleurs
Academics of Saint Martin's School of Art
Alumni of the Ruskin School of Art
20th-century British male artists
21st-century British male artists